Hunting Season is a 2010 Turkish drama film, written and directed by Yavuz Turgul, which stars Şener Şen and Cem Yılmaz as two policemen who team up with a rookie to investigate a murder case.

Plot
Veteran homicide cop Ferman (Şener Şen) and his hot-headed partner İdris (Cem Yılmaz) team up with rookie cop and anthropology major Hasan (Okan Yalabık) to investigate the murder of a young woman. The suspects include her conservative family, who might have killed her for honor, her drug-dealing boyfriend and aged billionaire Battal (Çetin Tekindor) who had taken the victim as his second wife.

Cast
 Şener Şen - Ferman, surnommé « Chasseur »
 Cem Yılmaz - İdris, surnommé « le Fou »
 Çetin Tekindor - Battal Çolakzade
 Melisa Sözen - Asiye
 Okan Yalabık - Çömez Hasan
 Mahir İpek - Murat Öneş
 Rıza Kocaoğlu - Asit Ömer
 Nergis Çorakçı - Hatun
 Mustafa Avkıran - Müslüm

Release

Reception

Box office
The film was number one at the Turkish box office for five-weeks running and has made a total gross of US$12,160,978.

See also
 2010 in film
 Turkish films of 2010

References

External links
  
 
 

2010 films
2010s Turkish-language films
2010s mystery drama films
2010 crime drama films
Films set in Turkey
Turkish crime drama films
Turkish mystery films
Warner Bros. films